Pennsylvania's state elections were held on November 4, 2008.  Necessary primary elections were held on April 22.

All 203 seats of the Pennsylvania House of Representatives, 25 seats of the Pennsylvania Senate, as well as the offices of Pennsylvania Treasurer, Pennsylvania Auditor General, and Pennsylvania Attorney General were up for election.

Presidential Primary

Democratic Primary

Pennsylvania's Democratic Primary to award the state's 158 pledged delegates took place on April 22, 2008. Senator Barack Obama and Senator Hillary Clinton were the only 2 Democratic candidates on the ballot.

According to official results from the primary, Clinton won 54.6% of the vote, and Obama took the remaining 45.4%.

Republican Primary

John McCain had already secured the majority of delegates for the Republican Party nomination, and captured 73% of Republican votes in the Pennsylvania primary.  Republican turn-out was low during the election, possibly due to party registration switching from Republican to Democrat.

Constitutional officers

Treasurer

Pennsylvania's election for State Treasurer was held in November 4, after incumbent Treasurer Robin Weissmann announced she would not run in 2008. Two major candidates ran for State Treasurer; Rob McCord, the Democratic nominee from Lower Merion, and Tom Ellis, a Montgomery County Commissioner, and unopposed nominee for the Republican Party. Rob McCord won the election, with 54.98% of the vote.

Attorney General
The primaries for Attorney General were held on April 22. This election marks the last time a Republican has been elected Attorney General of Pennsylvania. Incumbent Tom Corbett ran as the unopposed Republican candidate. Democratic candidate John Morganelli also ran unopposed. Former 2006 gubernatorial candidate Marakay Rogers as the Libertarian candidate. Tom Corbett was announced as the winner of the election on November 4.

Auditor General

Pennsylvania's election for Auditor General was held on November 8. Incumbent Auditor General Jack Wagner ran unopposed as the Democratic nominee. Manufacturing and construction executive Chet Beiler also ran unopposed as the Republican nominee after opponent Chris Walsh withdrew due to problems with nomination petitions.

Pennsylvania General Assembly
See: Pennsylvania House of Representatives election, 2008 and Pennsylvania State Senate elections, 2008.

Statewide Ballot Referendums
The ballot question asked the voters to authorize the issuance of $400,000,000 in bonds for the "acquisition, repair, construction, reconstruction, rehabilitation, extension, expansion and improvement" of sewage treatment facilities and water supply systems. The money raised would be dispensed by the Pennsylvania Infrastructure Investment Authority. The measure passed with a healthy statewide margin and had a gained a majority in 64 of 67 counties.

See also
United States House of Representatives elections in Pennsylvania, 2008

References

 
Pennsylvania